Eustoma exaltatum, commonly called seaside gentian, is a species of flowering plant in the gentian family (Gentianaceae).

Description
Eustoma exaltatum is an erect herbaceous plant with a glaucous, leafy stem. It produces large, purple, bell-shaped flowers throughout the growing season, peaking in spring through summer.

Eustoma russellianum is closely related to Eustoma exaltatum, and in some treatments they are ranked as subspecies, rather than as separate species.

Distribution
It is native to North America, where it found in from the southern United States and the West Indies, south to Mexico and Belize. Its natural habitat is wet places, such as alkaline marshes, stream beds, and saline coastal areas. It is moderately tolerant of inundation by salt water, and highly tolerant of salt winds.

References

Gentianaceae
Flora of Mexico
Flora of Belize